Geneviève Guilbault (born November 4, 1982) is a Canadian politician who was elected to the National Assembly of Quebec in a by-election held in the electoral district Louis-Hébert on October 2, 2017. She is a member of the Coalition Avenir Québec. On October 18, 2018 she was appointed Deputy Premier and Minister of Public Safety.

Prior to her election to the legislature, she worked as a communications officer for the provincial coroner's office. She had previously planned to run for the CAQ in the electoral district of Charlesbourg in the 2018 provincial election, but was selected as the by-election candidate in Louis-Hébert after the party's original candidate, Normand Sauvageau, resigned.

Electoral record

References 

Living people
Coalition Avenir Québec MNAs
People from Longueuil
Women MNAs in Quebec
21st-century Canadian politicians
1982 births
Deputy premiers of Quebec
Members of the Executive Council of Quebec
Women government ministers of Canada
Université Laval alumni
21st-century Canadian women politicians